Penny Vilagos (born April 17, 1963) was a Canadian synchronized swimmer and an Olympic medalist.

Career
Vilagos and her twin sister Vicky Vilagos began synchronized swimming at age eight. They won their first Canadian National Championship in duet at age seventeen, they would go to win five more national titles.
Penny Vilagos and Vicky Vilagos won a silver medal in the women's duet at the 1983 Pan American Games. They retired from synchronized swimming in 1985 after failing to make the 1984 Olympic team. In 1990 Penny and Vicky came out of retirement going on to win a silver medal in the women's duet at the 1992 Summer Olympics.

Honours
Vilagos was inducted into the Canadian Olympic Hall of Fame in 2002. In 2014 Vilagos was inducted into the International Swimming Hall of Fame.

References

External links
 Canadian Olympic Hall of Fame profile
 International Swimming Hall of Fame profile 

1963 births
Living people
Canadian synchronized swimmers
Olympic silver medalists for Canada
Olympic synchronized swimmers of Canada
Synchronized swimmers at the 1992 Summer Olympics
Olympic medalists in synchronized swimming
Canadian twins
Twin sportspeople
Medalists at the 1992 Summer Olympics
Pan American Games silver medalists for Canada
Pan American Games medalists in synchronized swimming
Synchronized swimmers at the 1983 Pan American Games
World Aquatics Championships medalists in synchronised swimming
Synchronized swimmers at the 1982 World Aquatics Championships
Medalists at the 1983 Pan American Games